The Greater Phoenix Economic Council (GPEC) is the investment promotion agency for the Greater Phoenix, Arizona area of the United States. GPEC says its goal is to market the Phoenix region in a way that attracts quality businesses and high-wage jobs. GPEC is a 501c3 nonprofit. It is a public-private partnership with about half of its funding comes from Maricopa County and local cities, while the other half comes from private-sector investors.

History 
In December 1988, Barron's financial newspaper featured a story called “Phoenix Descending: Is Boomtown USA Going Bust?” The article predicted that the Phoenix area would soon suffer from poor economic planning. In response, Phoenix Mayor Terry Goddard called an “Emergency Economic Development Summit” later that month, where the idea of an overarching investment promotion agency was proposed.

Despite some hesitation, by June 1989 the communities of Chandler, Glendale, Mesa, Phoenix, Scottsdale and Tempe had all agreed to participate in a regional economic development plan.

The Greater Phoenix Economic Council was officially born in August 1989, though it was originally known as the Greater Phoenix Partnership. Ioanna Morfessis served as GPEC's first President and CEO, a role she held for eight years. Morfessis was succeeded by Rick L. Weddle, who served from 1997 to 2004. Weddle was succeeded by Barry Broome from 2004-2014. GPEC's current President and CEO is Chris Camacho.

GPEC Communities 
Today, the Greater Phoenix Economic Council represents 22 communities.

References 

Economy of Phoenix, Arizona
Investment promotion agencies